William Ballhaus may refer to:
 William F. Ballhaus Sr. (1918–2013), American engineer
 William F. Ballhaus Jr. (born 1945), American engineer
 William L. Ballhaus (born c. 1967), American businessman